Culex (Culiciomyia) bailyi is a species of zoophilic mosquito belonging to the genus Culex. It is found in India, Sri Lanka, Thailand, Cambodia, Indonesia, Malaysia, Myanmar, Papua New Guinea, Philippines and New Guinea.

References

External links 
Culiciomyia Theobald, 1907 - Mosquito Taxonomic Inventory

bailyi
Insects described in 1934